The Macoun Developers Conference (pronounced as “Ma-coon” [mə'kuːn]) is a conference held annually since 2007 in Frankfurt am Main by Macoun GbR. It is Europe's biggest conference focused on Apple systems and is held in German.

While the event is organized by a single-purpose company, most of the work is done by a community on a pro-bono basis. Chris Hauser and Thomas Biedorf, founders of Macoun GbR, started the conference to allow European developers that cannot attend Apple's WWDC to have a “small WWDC”.

The number of attendees grew from initially 200 to around 450, with a maximum of 507 in 2016. The location, a youth hostel (“Haus der Jugend”), limits the number of attendees to 500. During the first ten years, 99 speakers have held more than 200 talks at Macoun.

The conference name “Macoun” is derived from the apple of the same name. Having “#Macoun” as official hashtag has led to confusion for American fruit-lovers on social media.

Topics 

The conference, dubbed by the press as “German alternative to WWDC” is a communication platform for developers on the Apple platform.

The conference values the direct exchange between developers, talks featuring latest technical topics, problems around software development, best practices, and topics around quality assurance.

Besides talks in up to three concurrent sessions, Macoun has workshops, exhibitions (Digital Retro Park’s Apple exhibition being the most notable), panels, and a experts group similar to WWDC labs (called Werkstatt).

Speakers 

The conference does not have paid speakers but nonetheless the list of speakers contains some widely known names such as Andy Abgottspon, Chris Eidhof, Max Seelemann (Winner of Apple Design Awards 2016), Ortwin Gentz (Where To?), Thomas Tempelmann (FCopy, Tempelmon, ...), Uli Kusterer (Uli's Moose) and others.

History

See also 

Apple
 WWDC

References

External links 
 

Apple Inc. conferences
International conferences in Germany